Jandrenouille is a village of Wallonia and a districrt of the municipality of Orp-Jauche, located in the province of Walloon Brabant, Belgium.

The village of Jandrain is situated just to the north of Jandrenouille.

Former municipalities of Walloon Brabant
Orp-Jauche